Saint Philip's Parish Church was built in 1640 as the Anglican church for Saint Philip Parish, Barbados. However the original structure was destroyed in a hurricane in 1780 and was rebuilt in 1786. However this structure was also destroyed in a hurricane on August 11th, 1831. The church was then rebuilt again, the new structure being consecrated on 20 October 1837 by Bishop William Hart Coleridge. On Ash Wednesday in 1977 (23 February) the building was partially damaged in a fire, but has since been restored.

Graveyard
The graveyard was consecrated at the same time as the restored church in October 1837. It contains the graves of various notable former residents:
 Cyril G. Sisnett (1875-1934)

References

Churches in Barbados
Churches completed in 1837
1640 establishments in the British Empire